Sarah Ellen Oliver Snow (née Murphy, 16 February 1864 – 13 February 1939) was a New Zealand political activist, feminist and welfare worker. She was born in Wellington, New Zealand in 1864. She was on the national executive of the Social Democratic Party. Together with Elizabeth McCombs, she was voted onto the first executive council of the New Zealand Labour Party in 1916. For a few years from 1927, the national Labour Party conferences were preceded by a Labour Women's Conference, and Snow was the president of these conferences.

Snow undertook charitable aid work and was on the Wellington Hospital board. After a hospital board meeting, she was struck by a tram in Riddiford Street outside Wellington Hospital on 19 January 1939. She broke her leg, but died on 13 February; the coroner's verdict was for heart failure caused by the shock of the crash.

References

1864 births
1939 deaths
People from Wellington City
New Zealand feminists
New Zealand social workers
Social Democratic Party (New Zealand) politicians
New Zealand Labour Party politicians
Wellington Hospital Board members